Rajevac is a surname. Notable people with the surname include:

 Filip Rajevac (born 1992), Serbian footballer
 Milovan Rajevac (born 1954), Serbian footballer and manager

See also
 

Serbian surnames